HMS Albemarle was a 90-gun second rate ship of the line of the Royal Navy, launched on 29 October 1680 at Harwich.

She was rebuilt in 1704 at Chatham Dockyard, remaining a 90-gun second rater. She was also renamed HMS Union at this time. She underwent a second rebuild at Chatham, from where she was relaunched on 8 February 1726 as a 90-gun second rater built to the 1719 Establishment.

Union was broken up in 1749.

Notes

References

Lavery, Brian (2003) The Ship of the Line - Volume 1: The development of the battlefleet 1650-1850. Conway Maritime Press. .

Ships of the line of the Royal Navy
1680s ships
Ships built in Harwich